Sport Club Corinthians Paulista is a Brazilian sports club based in the Tatuapé district of São Paulo. Although competing in a number of different sports, Corinthians is mostly known for its professional association football team that plays in the Campeonato Brasileiro Série A, the top tier of the Brazilian football, as well as in the Campeonato Paulista Série A1, the first division of the traditional in-state competition.

Founded in 1910 by five railway workers inspired by the London-based Corinthian Football Club, Corinthians has become one of the most successful Brazilian clubs, having won the national title seven times, in addition to three Copa do Brasil trophies, one Supercopa do Brasil and a record 30 São Paulo State championships. On the international stage, the club won the inaugural FIFA Club World Championship in 2000, winning it for the second time in 2012 after being crowned Copa Libertadores de América champions for the first time that same year.

The club's home kit traditionally features white shirts and black shorts, accompanied by white socks. Their traditional crest was introduced in 1939 by modernist painter Francisco Rebolo featuring the São Paulo state flag in a shield, two oars, and an anchor representing the club's early success in nautical sports. Since 2014, Corinthians has played its home matches at the Arena Corinthians, one of the venues in the 2014 FIFA World Cup, having hosted the opener on 12 June 2014 and a total of six matches during the tournament.

The club was listed by Forbes in 2017 as the most valuable football club in the Americas, worth $576.9 million. The club is one of the most widely supported teams in the world and the second most in Brazil, with over 30 million fans.

History

In 1910, the top clubs were formed by people who were part of the upper classes. Among them were Club Athletico Paulistano, São Paulo Athletic Club, & Associação Atlética das Palmeiras.  Lower-class society, excluded from larger clubs, founded their own minnow clubs and only played "floodplain" football.

Bucking the trend, a group of five workers of the São Paulo Railway, more precisely Joaquim Ambrose and Anthony Pereira (wall painters), Rafael Perrone (shoemaker), Anselmo Correia (driver) and Carlos Silva (general laborer), residents of the neighbourhood of Bom Retiro. It was 31 August 1910 when these workers were watching a match featuring a London-based club touring Brazil, Corinthian F.C.  After the match, while the group returned home, the men spoke of partnerships, business ideas, and general dreams of grandeur. In the mind of each one surfaced a great idea: the foundation of a club, after several exchanges in a lively argument, a common ground led those athletes the same dream. The arguments led to the conclusion that they would meet the next day to make a dream into reality.

On 1 September 1910, the group agreed to meet after sundown in public sight. That night at 8:30pm, on Rua José Paulino ("Rua dos Imigrantes" (Immigrants Street), the five workers reunited alongside their guest and neighbors from Bom Retiro. That night the club was founded, alongside its board of directors, who elected Miguel Battaglia as the first Club President.

Corinthians played their first match on 10 September 1910, away against União da Lapa, a respected amateur club in São Paulo; and despite being defeated by 1–0, this match would mark the beginning of a successful era as an amateur club.

On 14 September, Luis Fabi scored Corinthians' first goal against Estrela Polar, another amateur club in the city, and Corinthians won their first game 2–0.

With good results and an increasing number of supporters, Corinthians joined the Liga Paulista, after winning two qualifying games, and played in the São Paulo State Championship for the first time, in 1913. Just one year after joining the league, Corinthians was crowned champion for the first time (in 1914), and were again two years later. There were many fly-by-night teams popping up in São Paulo at the time, and during the first practice held by Corinthians a banner was placed by the side of the field stating "This One Will Last".

The year of 1922, the Centennial of Brazilian Independence, marks the start of Corinthians hegemony in the São Paulo State Championship. As football was almost exclusively played at Rio de Janeiro and São Paulo by that time, the two state champions were considered to be the two top clubs in Brazil. After defeating the Rio de Janeiro State Championship champion of that year, América, Corinthians joined the company of the great teams in Brazil.

The same year also marked the first of three State Championships in a row, something that happened again in 1928–30 and 1937–39.

Corinthians seemed destined to win State Championships in threes; after six years without being a champions, they came won three more from 1937 the 1939. The 1940s were a more difficult time; and the club would win a championship in 1941 and would only win their next in 1951.

At the beginning of the 1950s Corinthians made history in the São Paulo Championship. In 1951, the team composed of Carbone, Cláudio, Luisinho, Baltasar and Mário scored 103 goals in thirty matches of the São Paulo Championship, registering an average of 3.43 per game. Carbone was the top goal-scorer of the competition with 30 goals. The club would also win the São Paulo Championships of 1952 and 1954. In this same decade, Corinthians were champions three times of the Rio-São Paulo Championship (1950, 1953 and 1954), the tournament that was becoming most important in the country with the increased participation of the greatest clubs from the two most important footballing states in the country.

In 1953, in a championship in Venezuela, Corinthians won the Small Cup of the World, a championship that many consider as a precursor of the Worldwide Championship of Clubs. On the occasion, Corinthians, substituting for Vasco da Gama, went to Caracas, the Venezuelan capital and recorded six consecutive victories against Roma (1–0 and 3–1), Barcelona (3–2 and 1–0) and Selection of Caracas (2–1 and 2–0). The club would also win the Cup of the Centenary of São Paulo, in the same year (1954).

After the triumphs in the São Paulo Championship and the Rio-São Paulo of 1954, Corinthians had a lengthy title drought. The breakthrough finally came when they won the São Paulo state championship in 1977, breaking a string of 23 years without a major title.

Under the leadership of Sócrates, Wladimir and Casagrande, Corinthians were the first Brazilian club in which players decided about concentração, a common Brazilian practice where the football players were locked up in a hotel days before a game, and discussed politics. (In the early 1980s, military dictatorship, after two decades, ended in Brazil). In 1982, before the election of government of São Paulo State, the team wore a kit with the words: DIA 15 VOTE (Vote on 15th), trying to motivate the biggest number of fans to vote.

In 1990, Corinthians won their first Campeonato Brasileiro Série A, beating their rivals, São Paulo in the final at the opponents' own stadium, Estádio do Morumbi. In the following year, Corinthians beat Flamengo and won the Supercopa do Brasil. In the 1995, the club won the Copa do Brasil for the first time, beating Grêmio in the final at the Estádio Olímpico Monumental in Porto Alegre. In the same decade, the club won the state championship in 1995, 1997 and 1999, and won the national championship again in 1998 and in 1999. In 2000, the club won the first FIFA Club World Cup, beating Vasco da Gama on penalties in the final.

In 2001 and in 2003 and the Copa do Brasil in 2002, beating Brasiliense in the final.

Between 1990 and 2005, the club also won the Ramón de Carranza Trophy in 1996, the Rio-São Paulo Tournament in 2002, the São Paulo Youth Cup in 1995, 1999, 2004, and 2005, and the Dallas Cup in 1999 and 2000.

The club's situation in early 2004 was among the most difficult in their history. Bad administration, lack of money and terrible campaigns both in the 2003 Brazilian Championship and in the 2004 São Paulo State Championship caused their millions of supporters to worry. Fortunately, some young players and a new manager Tite helped the team to improve from their terrible start. At the end of the championship, Corinthians finished in 5th place and gained entry to the Copa Sudamericana (a minor continental championship).

This situation was one of the factors which enabled Corinthians' president, Alberto Dualib, to convince the club's advisors to sign a controversial deal with an international fund of investors called Media Sports Investment. The deal granted the company a large degree of control over the club for 10 years in exchange for large financial investments in return. This has brought many quality players to the team, such as Carlos Tevez, Roger, Javier Mascherano and Carlos Alberto.

Despite the MSI investments, Corinthians experienced a slow start in the 2005 state championship, but managed to improve as it progressed, eventually managing to finish second. Their start to the Brazilian championship during 2005 was difficult, too, but after Daniel Passarella's dismissal (due to an unexpected 5–1 loss to Corinthians' rivals, São Paulo), the club finished the championship round well, and were eventually crowned Brazilian Champions for the fourth time, after a controversial annulment of eleven games due to a betting scandal.

The relationship between Corinthians' managers and the MSI president, Kia Joorabchian was not good, and after being eliminated in the Copa Libertadores, the club experienced a crisis which was responsible for the bad performances for the rest of 2006. Eventually, the partnership came to an end.

On 2 December 2007, following a 1–1 draw away to Grêmio, Corinthians were relegated to the second division.

Corinthians, who won promotion to the top division of Brazilian football for 2009 by winning the Serie B tournament, signed with three-time FIFA Player of the Year Ronaldo. In 2009, led by Ronaldo, Corinthians won their 26th Campeonato Paulista and their third Copa do Brasil. Confirming the club's good moment, Corinthians finished the Campeonato Brasileiro 2010 in 3rd place, granting their place on the subsequent Copa Libertadores.
After being eliminated from the South American tournament by the relatively less traditional Deportes Tolima, though, Corinthians saw Ronaldo retire from football. To replace him, the club signed with other 2006 national squad veteran Adriano. In 2011, Corinthians won their fifth national title.

On 4 July, after reaching the final of the 2012 Copa Libertadores undefeated, Corinthians won its first title after a two-match final against 6-time champions Boca Juniors by drawing 1–1 in Argentina and winning 2-0 at the Estádio do Pacaembu in São Paulo, becoming the ninth Brazilian side to win the Copa Libertadores. The club won the 2012 FIFA Club World Cup after defeating English club Chelsea 1–0 on 16 December 2012.

Visual identity

Colours

Even though the club has been recognized by the colors black and white for most of their history, the first Corinthians' kit originally consisted of cream shirts and black shorts. Back then, the choice of colors proved wrong, as the cream color would gradually fade white when the shirts were washed, representing a cost a recently created club could not afford. Thus, early after the foundation, the official shirt colors were changed to white. In 1954 the traditional black with thin white stripes uniform was introduced, and became the alternative uniform since then.

Badge

The Corinthians' shirt had no badge or crest until 1913, when the club joined the Liga Paulista, that mandated that every club in the competition should have one in their uniforms. A simple composition of the letters C (Corinthians) and P (Paulista) was hastily created and embroidered on the players uniforms for the upcoming matches, thus being considered the club's first de facto badge.

Unlike the kit, the badge went through several changes over the years. In 1914, lithographer Hermogenes Barbuy, brother of then-player Amilcar Barbuy designed the club's first official badge, which premiered at a friendly against Torino (Italy), in São Paulo. In 1919, the round shield with the São Paulo state flag was introduced, and modified in 1939 by modernist painter Francisco Rebolo, a former reserve player of the club in the 1920s, to include a string, an anchor and two oars, representing the early success the club achieved in nautical sports. Thereafter, the badge passed through small changes over time, specifically in the flag and in the frame.

In 1990, a yellow star was added above the badge to celebrate Corinthians' first national title. The same would occur when achieving the national titles in 1998, 1999 and 2005, and a larger star was introduced in 2000 after winning the inaugural FIFA Club World Cup. The stars remained as part of the badge until 2011, when the board decided the badge would not present any stars in the future.

Badge evolution

Kit suppliers and sponsors
Nike is the manufacturer of the club's kit since 2003. Previous manufacturers have been: Topper (1980–1989, 1999–2002), Finta (1990–1994) and Penalty (1995–1998).

In 2017, Corinthians and Nike have reached a 12-year U$115 million deal to renew their partnership until 2029

Previous main sponsors have been: Bombril (1982), Cofap (1983), Citizen (1984), Bic (1984), Corona (1984), Kalunga (1985–1994), Suvinil (1995–1996), Banco Excel (1996–1998), Embratel (1998), Batavo (1999–2000; 2009), Pepsi (2000–2004), Samsung (2005–2007), Medial Saúde (2008), Hypermarcas (2009–2012), Iveco (2012), Caixa (2012–2017), Banco BMG (2019–2021) and Neo Química (2021–).

Facilities

Stadiums

Early grounds
The first playing ground Corinthians used was located in the neighborhood of Bom Retiro (where the club was founded in 1910), in a vacant lot owned by a firewood seller, from which it got its nickname: Campo do Lenheiro ("Lumberjack's field"). It was the time of the floodplain and the players themselves had to clean and flatten the lawn.

In January 1918, Corinthians inaugurated its first official football field, Ponte Grande, on the banks of Tiete River. The land was leased from the municipality under the influence of the intellectual Antonio de Alcantara Machado, one of the first to approach the club workers. It was built by the players and fans in a community helping system. The Corinthians played their games there until 1927, upon the completion of their first stadium. It was then donated to São Bento.

Parque São Jorge
In 1926, the club purchased Parque São Jorge ("Saint George's Park"), located within the Tatuapé district of the city, belonging to then rivals Esporte Clube Sírio, After purchasing, President Ernesto Cassano decided to reform the stage, with financial support from the members.

The renovated Parque São Jorge, still without floodlights, was inaugurated on 22 July, in a friendly game against América-RJ that ended in a 2-2 draw. The land purchased included a Syrian farm - hence the nickname Fazendinha ("Little Farm"), still used today. It was from here that the Corinthians began to develop and could build up its headquarters.

Due to their growing number of fans, Estádio Alfredo Schürig (the official name of "Fazendinha") and the commissioning of city-owned Pacaembu in the 1940s, from the 1950s the stadium was mostly used for Academy level competitions and friendly matches. The last first team match played there was a friendly against Brasiliense on 3 August 2002. Since 1997, it is also the home ground of the professional women's football team.

Pacaembu
The club has established a relationship with Paulo Machado de Carvalho Stadium, which belongs to the municipality of São Paulo and is best known as Pacaembu Stadium, inaugurated in 1940 as the largest stadium in Latin America with a capacity of more than 70,000 people, in a double-fixture that pitted rivals Palestra Italia against Coritiba in the preliminary match and then current three-time state champion Corinthians against Atlético Mineiro, in a match Corinthians won by 4–2. Currently, the Pacaembu has capacity for up to 40,000 spectators.

Arena Corinthians

In 2009 there were some conjectures that the government of São Paulo could make a deal for a 30-year allotment of Pacaembu, but it never materialized, even though it was the club's directors preference, with projects designed to that matter.

After Estádio do Morumbi, then named as the city's host in the World Cup, failed to comply to FIFA's standards, a new project to create a home for Corinthians emerged as a possibility. In August 2010 the president of CBF, Ricardo Teixeira, along with Governor of São Paulo state, Alberto Goldman, and the mayor of São Paulo, Gilberto Kassab announced that the opening ceremony of the World Cup of Brazil would be held in the new Corinthians Stadium to be built in the district of Itaquera, in the eastern part of São Paulo city.

On 1 September 2020 (Corinthians' 110th anniversary) a special event live from the stadium was held to announce the Arena's new name. It was officially renamed Neo Química Arena, part of a 20-year partnership with Hypera Pharma, Brazil's largest pharmaceutical company. Neo Química is Hypera's generic drugs division, which already served as Corinthians' main sponsor during the 2010 and 2011 seasons. The full contract is expected to be around R$300–320 million.

Training facilities

CT Joaquim Grava
Corinthians inaugurated their state-of-the-art training facilities in September, 2010 during the celebrations of the club's 100th anniversary. The training facilities were named after long-time associate and consulting medical doctor, Joaquim Grava, that oversaw the medical department construction.

The training facilities feature a 32 bedroom hotel for the players, a bio-mechanics complex (Lab Corinthians-R9. named after Brazilian legend Ronaldo), a center for player rehabilitation and therapy (CePROO, named after fan and journalist Osmar de Oliveira), basketball and volleyball courts (approved by FIBA and FIVB for official matches), as well as other amenities.

An extension to be used by the Academy teams is currently under construction.

Club culture

Supporters
The Corinthians fanbase is fondly called Fiel ("The Faithful"), starring memorable moments like the "Corinthian Invasion" (pt / Invasão Corinthiana) in 1976, when more than 70,000 Corinthians Fans traveled from São Paulo to Rio de Janeiro to watch the match against Fluminense at Maracana Stadium, in that year's national championship semifinals, as well as having one of the biggest average attendances in the country. Fans being famous for being passionate about the team and loyal supporters motivated the club to make a tribute documentary to their fans, named  "Faithful" (pt / Fiel), highlighting the fans' support in one of the most difficult moments in the club's history: the relegation to national second division in 2007. Similar initiatives would be made in the next years, reflecting other moments in the club's history in that the fanbase was essential.

Integral to the club culture are the fan organizations ("torcidas organizadas") such as Gaviões da Fiel ("The Hawks of the Faithful"), founded in 1969 by fans attempting to recover political and administrative control of the club and now the largest of such organizations in Brazil with almost 100,000 associates. Camisa 12 ("The 12th Shirt", founded in 1971), Estopim da Fiel ("Faithful's Fuse", 1979), Coringão Chopp ("Corinthians Draught Beer", 1989), Pavilhão Nove ("Pavillion Nine", 1990), and Fiel Macabra ("Macabre Faithful", 1993) are other important fan organizations that have been actively supporting social and cultural activities representing the club.

Many of the groups above have established branches for fans living outside of São Paulo city, out-state and even internationally. Most are also involved in the Brazilian Carnival festivities, most famously Gaviões da Fiel, one of the most important Carnival of São Paulo Parade samba schools, having won the contest for 4 times, the most among football team organizations.

Rivalries

Derby Paulista

Derby Paulista is a crosstown fixture between Corinthians and Palmeiras, consistently cited as one of the greatest rivalries worldwide by sources including FIFA and CNN. Palmeiras was founded by a group of Italians who were formerly members of Corinthians.  Since 1914, when that treasonous act was taken upon these former supporters, a deep-seated hatred was born. The Derby atmosphere is fierce on and off the pitch, as violence is a norm between the clubs.

Clássico Majestoso

Clássico Majestoso is a crosstown fixture between Corinthians and São Paulo.  The Derby dates back to 1935, at the final re-founding São Paulo after being thrice defunct. Corinthians possesses the largest number of supporters in the state (25 Million), whereas São Paulo's lies in second place (16 Million). The Clássico's most memorable match for Corinthians is the 1990 Campenato Brasileiro finals, which led to Corinthians first national title.

Clássico Alvinegro
Clássico Alvinegro is a regional fixture between Corinthians and Santos.'Alvinegro' is given after the colors worn by both teams, black and white (Alvi, from Latin albus, white, and negro, black).  The Classico reached one of its highest stages for Corinthians supporters when Corinthians met Santos in the Semi-Finals of Libertadores 2012. Corinthians won 2-1 on aggregate.

Other rivalries
Derby dos Invictos (Derby of the Undefeated), Corinthians and Portuguesa is a crosstown rivalry. Corinthians vs Ponte Preta is an in-state rivalry that peaked in the 1977 Campeonato Paulista final, which led to Ponte Preta's greatest Paulista Finish (runner-up). Classico das Multidões (Classic of The Masses) is an inter-state rivalry pegging the two most supported teams in Brazil: Corinthians and Flamengo. Corinthians and Vasco led to great match ups and some rivalry recently, mostly after Vasco winning the Brasileirão in 1997 and 2000, and Corinthians in 1998 and 1999. Their greatest match coincided with the first FIFA Club World Cup in 2000, with a Corinthians victory in the penalty shootout. Corinthians also won the 2011 Brasileirão in the last round of the season, two points over the runners-up Vasco. Corinthians saved Vasco from their usual runner-up fate by defeating the cariocas in 2012 Libertadores Quarter-finals.

Symbology

Musketeer
Corinthians' official mascot is the Musketeer, a symbol of bravery, audacity and fighting spirit. The adoption of that character recalls the first years of the club.

In 1913 most of the leading football clubs in São Paulo State founded the APEA (Paulista Athletic Sports Association). The depleted Paulista League was left with only Americano, Germania and Internacional, known as the "three musketeers" of São Paulo football. Corinthians joined the three as D'Artagnan, being the fourth and most adored musketeer, just like in Alexandre Dumas, père's novel The Three Musketeers. To be accepted in that "musketeers universe", Corinthians had to show their bravery. As there was many other teams who coveted the spot in the Liga Paulista, Corinthians participated in a selective tournament against Minas Gerais and São Paulo, two other great teams of Paulista amateur football at that time. The Corinthian team beat Minas 1–0 and São Paulo 4–0, earning acceptance into the group and acquiring the right to participate in the Special Division of the Paulista League in the following year.

Saint George
An important symbol for Corinthians is Saint George/(Ogum). Saint George is one of the most revered Catholic Saints in Brazil, a nation with a blend of cultures.  The collusion between African & European cultures is seen in Brazil's definition of São Jorge as a mash between Catholicism & Western African Mythology.  The comparison may be drawn the entities similar characteristics; St George, the soldier who protects those who pray to him; Ogum God of War who serves the communities who believe in him.  it is this warrior demeanor that made Corinthians fans indebted to São Jorge.

Corinthians began as a small team for the lower classes of São Paulo, even though they obtained initial success.  Lack of respect for the working class forced Corinthians to leave their São Paulo State Football League in protest.  after multiple championships Timão made its largest leap in prestige in the founding of a Corinthians' Headquarters, 1926.  The creation of said headquarters became the first fusion of Timão & São Jorge.  The land purchased for the headquarters was formerly Parque São Jorge (St. George Park) at 777 Rua São Jorge, Tatuapé, São Paulo, SP.

Corinthians support for São Jorge became fanatical during the decade of the 60's, Between 1954 and 1977, Corinthians failed to add to its gallery of conquests and the Corinthian Nation lived the hardest moments of its history. While the stream struggled in the 60's, fan recanted that they were blessed by a "Santo Guerreiro" (Warrior Saint). In the early 60's the lack of success lingered in the minds of fans & gave birth to a utilization of the blessings of São Jorge.  this caused Corinthians to erect a chapel in honor of the saint, in order to strengthen the clubs resolve via mysticism.  1969, after the death of two players Lidu & Eduardo, the funeral was held in Capela São Jorge, & strengthened the clubs identity at a time when championships were non-existent. 1974 Paulista Final, after a heart-wrenching loss to arch-rival Palmeiras,  composer Paulinho Nogueira recorded "Oh Corinthians", a song that had popular commercial success at the time. In the verses of the composition dedicated to the suffering Corinthians could not miss the quote to the patron Saint George:

"...Oh, são 20 anos de espera. Mas meu São Jorge me dê forças, para poder um dia enfim, descontar meu sofrimento em quem riu de mim".
("... Oh, It's been 20 years of waiting, but my St. George gives me strength to be able to one day finally cashing in my suffering upon those who laughed at me.)"

Corinthians' 2011 third kit was burgundy colored & featured São Jorge slaughtering a dragon in a dark watermark across the right side of the chest.  The utilization of São Jorge's image on the shirt is the practice of São Jorge's Prayer.

Board of directors

Current administration

Former presidents

Players and staff

First-team squad

Academy

Note: Academy players registered for 2023 Campeonato Paulista matches

Out on loan

Technical staff

Football honours and statistics

Honours

Recent seasons

See also

 Corinthians (women's football)
 Corinthians (futsal)
 Corinthians (beach soccer)
 Corinthians (basketball)
 Corinthians Steamrollers (american football)
 Corinthians (rugby)

Notes

References

External links 

 
Acervo SCCP – all matches and history of Corinthians
Committee for Preservation of Corinthians' Memories
FIFA Home Page
Book – Top 10 Idols

 
Multi-sport clubs in Brazil
Football clubs in Brazil
Football clubs in São Paulo (state)
Football clubs in São Paulo
Association football clubs established in 1910
C
C
C
1910 establishments in Brazil
Copa do Brasil winning clubs
Campeonato Brasileiro Série A winning clubs